The Chelsea Greenway is a rail trail in Chelsea, Massachusetts. The  linear park runs parallel to a Silver Line bus rapid transit busway that follows the former Grand Junction Branch right-of-way. Located within the Box District neighborhood, the path connects Bellingham Square station and Eastern Avenue station.

History
In October 2013, after several months of planning, MassDOT announced that it had secured $3 million in funding for the trail as part of the Silver Line Gateway Extension project, then expected to be completed in 2015. The Greenway opened in 2018 along with the busway, while $1.1 million in landscaping and planting of native species took place in 2019.

References

External links

Chelsea, Massachusetts
Parks in Suffolk County, Massachusetts
Parks in Massachusetts
Bike paths in Massachusetts
Greenways
Rail trails in Massachusetts
Boston and Albany Railroad
Protected areas of Suffolk County, Massachusetts